If I Were a Carpenter may refer to:

 "If I Were a Carpenter" (song), a song composed by Tim Hardin and popularized by Bobby Darin
 If I Were a Carpenter (Bobby Darin album), a 1966 album by Bobby Darin
 If I Were a Carpenter (tribute album), a tribute album to The Carpenters
 "If I Were a Carpenter", an episode of Auf Wiedersehen, Pet